FK Badnjevac is a football club based in Badnjevac, Serbia. They currently compete in the Šumadija District League, the fifth tier of the national league system.

History
Following the dissolution of the former Yugoslavia, the club earned promotion to the Second League of FR Yugoslavia in 1993. They subsequently placed seventh in their debut season in the competition. Over the next two years (1994–95 and 1995–96), the club finished in eight and ninth place, respectively. They also surprisingly reached the 1995–96 FR Yugoslavia Cup semi-finals, losing 3–2 on aggregate to Partizan. The club went on to spend two more seasons in the second tier of the national league system, before suffering relegation to the Serbian League Morava in 1998.

Honours
Rača-Knić-Batočina Intermunicipal League (Tier 6)
 2020–21
Rača-Batočina Municipal League (Tier 7)
 2017–18

References

External links
 Club page at Srbijasport

1922 establishments in Serbia
Association football clubs established in 1922
Football clubs in Serbia
Batočina